Shirley Rose Eikhard (7 November 1955 – 15 December 2022) was a Canadian singer-songwriter. Although moderately successful in Canada as a performer in her own right, she had her greatest Canadian and international success as a songwriter for other artists, most notably as the writer of Bonnie Raitt's 1991 hit "Something to Talk About".

Early life
Eikhard was born in Sackville, New Brunswick. Her mother, June Eikhard (born Marguerite Cameron in Moncton) began her musical career with her husband, Eikhard's late father, bassist Cecil Eikhard, in the 1950s when both parents were members of a small local band, the Tantramar Ramblers. Her mother, June, released her debut album, Canada's First Lady of the Fiddle, in 1959, and was the first woman to participate in the Canadian Open Old Time Fiddlers' Contest.

The family relocated to Oshawa, Ontario, when Eikhard was in her early teens. She was given her first guitar at age 11, and at age 12 she first performed on stage at a fiddling festival in Cobourg, Ontario.

Career
At age 13, following her debut performance in Cobourg, Eikhard successfully auditioned for the Songwriter's Workshop at the 1969 Mariposa Folk Festival where she played alongside Joni Mitchell, Ian & Sylvia, and Bruce Cockburn. Two years later, when she was 15, her song "It Takes Time" was recorded by Anne Murray and became a hit in Canada. The song was also recorded by Kim Carnes for her 1971 album Rest on Me.

In 1972, Earl Ball of Capitol Records was alerted to her growing reputation and signed her to the label. She released her first album, Shirley Eikhard, which was moderately successful and won Eikhard two Juno Awards for Country Female Artist of the Year at both the Juno Awards of 1973 and the Juno Awards of 1974.

After a three-year career break, she returned to recording and released three albums for Attic Records, Child of the Present, Let Me Down Easy, and Horizons. Though again none were big sellers, they included her cover versions of Lindsey Buckingham’s "Don’t Let Me Down" and Christine McVie’s "Say You Love Me". "Say You Love Me" was released as a single several weeks in advance of Fleetwood Mac in early June 1976. Eikhard took the song into the Canadian top 40, peaking at No. 34; Fleetwood Mac's version, released only a few weeks later, peaked at No. 29 in September.

In 1981, Emmylou Harris recorded Eikhard's "Good News", later also releasing a version of Eikhard’s "Maybe Tonight".

Through the 1980s, she battled both stage fright and throat problems, and was advised by her doctor that she should stop performing in clubs due to an allergy to cigarette smoke. Following her 1987 album Taking Charge for WEA Records, a period which she would later describe as the nadir of her life, her prominence in the music industry had significantly declined, and she had started to pursue background extra work in film and television to support herself. By 1989, however, the tide began to turn for her as a songwriter again, with singers such as Rita Coolidge and Alannah Myles recording Eikhard songs.

Anne Murray had wanted to record Eikhard's "Something to Talk About" in 1985, but the song was rejected by her producers; despite the song not being on Murray's album, it was still titled Something to Talk About. In 1991, Bonnie Raitt recorded the song and released it as the lead-off single for her album Luck of the Draw. The biggest chart hit for both Eikhard and Raitt, the song had significant airplay throughout the 1990s. The song earned Raitt a Grammy Award for Best Female Pop Vocal Performance in 1991, with the album earning Raitt a second Grammy that year.  In Canada, "Something to Talk About" earned Eikhard a Juno nomination as Songwriter of the Year at the Juno Awards of 1992, and later a SOCAN Classics award.

Although she toured earlier in her career, Eikhard later refrained from exhaustive touring. She performed at selected events and occasional club dates, often with her brother, the late Brent Eikhard.

In the early 1990s, she performed with Gwen Swick and Cherie Camp in the trio The Three Marias; her songs were also recorded by artists such as Quartette ("It's Just a Little Rain") and Cher ("Born with the Hunger"). She sang the theme song to the movie The Passion of Ayn Rand, "Love Is, Love Is Not". "Lovers Forever", a song she originally wrote with Cher for the 1994 film Interview with the Vampire, is featured on Cher's 2013 studio album Closer to the Truth.

In 1995, she recorded a new album, If I Had My Way, co-produced with her long-standing keyboard player Evelyne Datl. She also contributed the theme song to a new Warner Brothers film, Something to Talk About. In the late 1990s she started to record and perform jazz, releasing the albums The Jazz Sessions (1996) and Going Home (1998), headlining her own concert special in 1998 as an episode of Bravo!'s Live at the Rehearsal Hall.

In 2020, Eikhard was inducted into the Canadian Songwriters Hall of Fame for "Something to Talk About".

Eikhard released her final album, On My Way to You in October 2021. It featured the song "Anything Is Possible", about her recent diagnosis with cancer.

Personal life
Eikhard's partner, Lola Catherine Osborne, died in 2021. Eikhard lived in Harriston, Ontario.

Eikhard died of cancer in Orangeville, Ontario on 15 December 2022, at the age of 67.

Awards and recognition
1973: winner, Juno Award for Best Country Female Artist
1974: winner, Juno Award for Best Country Female Artist
1992: nominee, Juno Award for Songwriter of the Year
2020: inducted, Canadian Songwriter's Hall of Fame

Discography

Albums

Singles

References

External links
Shirley Eikhard official site
 
 

1955 births
2022 deaths
Attic Records (Canada) artists
Canadian women country singers
Canadian country singer-songwriters
Juno Award winners
Musicians from Sackville, New Brunswick
Musicians from Oshawa
Writers from New Brunswick
Writers from Ontario
20th-century Canadian women singers
20th-century Canadian writers
21st-century Canadian women singers
21st-century Canadian writers
Canadian LGBT singers
Canadian women pop singers
Canadian women jazz singers
21st-century Canadian LGBT people
20th-century Canadian LGBT people